Soyuz 39 was a 1981 Soviet crewed space flight to the Salyut 6 space station. It was the fifteenth expedition, and carried the eighth international crew to the orbiting facility. The crew visited Vladimir Kovalyonok and Viktor Savinykh, who had reached Salyut-6 ten days prior.

The flight carried Vladimir Dzhanibekov and Jügderdemidiin Gürragchaa into space. With this mission, Gürragchaa became the first Mongolian, and second Asian cosmonaut.

The Mongolian contribution for this mission had begun in 1967, when the president of the Mongolian Academy of Sciences Bazaryn Shirendev attended a conference of scientists from socialist countries in Moscow, where the Intercosmos project was announced. Dzhanibekov and Gürragchaa performed about thirty experiments during the course of the mission.

Crew

Backup crew

Mission parameters
Mass: 6800 kg
Perigee: 197.5 km
Apogee: 282.8 km
Inclination: 51.6°
Period: 89.01 minutes

Mission highlights
 
Soyuz 39 docked with the first Mongolian cosmonaut aboard. The resident EO-6 crew assisted the Intercosmos crew with station equipment and oriented the station according to the needs of the visiting crew's experiments.

On 24 March, the cosmonauts installed cosmic ray detectors in the station's work and transfer compartments. On 26 March the cosmonauts performed the Illuminator ("viewing port") experiment, which studied the degradation of the station's viewports. On 27 March, Vladimir Kovalyonok and Viktor Savinykh of the resident crew used the Gologramma ("hologram") apparatus to image a viewing port damaged by micrometeoroids. They repeated this experiment the next day, when they also collected samples of the station's air and microflora and removed the cosmic ray detectors for return to Earth. 28–29 March were largely devoted to studies of Mongolia from space. The visiting crew also checked out their spacecraft on 29 March

The Soviet news service TASS noted that by 29 March, Salyut 6 had conducted 20,140 revolutions of Earth.

See also

List of human spaceflights to Salyut space stations
List of Salyut expeditions

References

External links
 Website commemorating 30 years since the spaceflight

Crewed Soyuz missions
Spacecraft launched in 1981
Mongolia–Soviet Union relations
1981 in the Soviet Union
Spacecraft which reentered in 1981